Moshe (Moses) Teitelbaum (Yiddish: משה טײטלבױם; November 17, 1914 – April 24, 2006) was a Hasidic rebbe and the world leader of the Satmar Hasidim.

Early life

Moshe Teitelbaum was born on November 17, 1914, in Újfehértó, Hungary. He was the second son of Rabbi Chaim Tzvi Teitelbaum, author of Atzei Chaim, the previous Sigheter Rebbe. His mother, Bracha Sima, hailed from the prominent Halbershtam family. Moshe and his older brother, Yekusiel Yehuda Teitelbaum, were orphaned in 1926, when they were eleven and fourteen, respectively. Moshe was raised by family friends and relatives, including his uncle, Joel Teitelbaum, and his grandfather, Rabbi Shulem Eliezer Halberstam of Ratzfert.

Teitelbaum received rabbinical Ordination, and was appointed dean of the Karacscka yeshiva.  In 1936, Teitelbaum married Leah Meir, daughter of Rabbi Hanoch Heinoch Meir of Karecska. In 1939, he became the rabbi of Senta, Yugoslavia (now Serbia).

In late spring 1944, the Hungarian government, assisted by Nazi forces led by Adolf Eichmann, began deporting Jews en-masse. Teitelbaum and his wife Leah were sent to the Auschwitz concentration camp, where his wife and three children were murdered, and he nearly died.  Teitelbaum was then transferred to the Brabag plant in Tröglitz, and afterwards to Theresienstadt, where he was liberated in 1945.

Post-war
In 1946, Teitelbaum married Pessel Leah, the daughter of Rabbi Aaron Teitelbaum of Volovo. Pessel Leah's entire family was killed in the Auschwitz concentration camp.

The couple initially moved back to Senta, where Teitelbaum led a congregation before the war. When he found out that his brother Yekusiel Yehuda Teitelbaum had been murdered in the Holocaust, he decided to fill his brother's position as rabbi of Sighet. Soon thereafter, they were forced to flee Communist persecution, leaving for Prague and then setting sail for New York City, where they arrived in fall 1947. There, Teitelbaum became known as the Sigheter Rebbe, leading Sighet Chassidus, previously led by his ancestors. He initially established a beth midrash, Atzei Chaim Siget, in Williamsburg, Brooklyn, and later moved to Borough Park, Brooklyn, in 1966.

Appointment to Satmar Rebbe
In 1979, Moshe's uncle Joel died, without an heir to inherit leadership of Satmar. The most logical successor was his nephew Moshe, then at the age of sixty-six. He was considered intelligent, a scholar, and a good speaker. There was some uneasiness about appointing Moshe, because in the years prior, he had limited contact with Satmar, led his own Hasidic group, and did not necessarily have the same absolutist outlook, level of scholarship, or intense piety, as his late uncle. Nevertheless, it was understood that the community was better off with a leader, and having Moshe as the Rebbe was the best for the community under the given circumstances. The Satmar Council of Elders was a thirteen-member lay-person body elected by Satmar Hasidim. The Council unanimously decided on Moshe as their next Rebbe. Moshe could have turned down the appointment and remained as leader of his small Sighet sect, but leadership of Satmar promised far more power and prestige. The Council and Moshe then negotiated and planned the details on Moshe's official appointment. A few weeks later, on one day's notice, a general meeting in the main Rodney Street synagogue was announced. At the meeting, in which Moshe was not present, Sender Deutsch, leader of the Council, announced the appointment of Moshe as the new rebbe of Satmar.

Moshe refused to be accepted as the new rebbe within the first year of Joel's death. This was done as a sign of bereavement over his uncle, who helped raise him when his father died, and to allow the Satmar community to mourn and adjust to the transition. Moshe continued to live in Borough Park and lead his Sighet community.

Around August 1980, Moshe formally succeeded Joel as the Satmar Rebbe in an elaborate "crowning" in Kiryas Joel, New York. At the ceremony, Moshe spoke and acknowledged that he cannot replace Joel, telling the Hasidim not to expect from him what they received from Joel.

Some Satmar Hasidim did not accept him as the rebbe, including the Bnei Yoel (or Kagners, opponents), a group of Hasidim who remained loyal to Joel's wife, Fayga Teitelbaum. Moshe Teitelbaum and his aunt Fayga never had a good relationship. Tension between the two began back when Fayga married Joel Teitelbaum.  Fayga was Joel's second wife, and Joel already had a grown daughter. The grown daughter and Fayga fought over control of the household, and Moshe sided with his cousin against his aunt. Later, Joel's daughter died, and Fayga failed to bear any children and an heir for Joel.

As Satmar Rebbe

Moshe's start as Satmar Rebbe was marked with more controversy. Soon after becoming Rebbe, Moshe appointed his son Aaron as the chief rabbi and rosh yeshiva of the Satmar congregation in Kiryas Joel, New York, essentially giving him authority over all the community's affairs. The residents of Kiryas Joel at that time resented the appointment of Aaron, having issues with his personality and controlling nature. Moshe also removed Joel's established personnel from positions of authority, and replaced them with his loyalists. 
 
Concerns about Moshe's level of piety also mounted. Likely false rumors circulated that in the negotiations between the Council and Moshe, prior to Moshe ascending as Rebbe, Moshe made numerous compensation demands, including demands that property be placed in his name, and special fees for High Holiday services. Other likely false rumors claimed that Moshe was engrossed in business, had a stock market ticker-tape in his house, and was busy promoting his real estate investments.

As Rebbe, Moshe recognized his stature relative to the stature of his uncle Joel, and considered himself a "custodian" of what Joel created. He stated: "We must not blaze new trails, but study the teachings of my uncle." He continued many of the customs enacted by Joel. The differences between Joel and Moshe were noted in that, unlike the more mystical Joel, Moshe was more practical and plain-spoken. Moshe did not speak out against Zionism as often as Joel, though that may be due to the fact that it did not have the same ideological draw during Moshe's tenure. Some complained that Moshe was not as charitable as Joel, though that may be because Moshe did not raise as much charity funds as the more charismatic Joel.

In 1989, tensions between Moshe and the Bnei Yoel were exacerbated. In an April 1989 Passover speech, Moshe referred to the Bnei Yoel as "infidels". He later enacted a rule that new residents had to obtain permission from village leaders before moving in. In 1990, the two groups erupted in violence when a supporter of Fayga tried to erect a gate outside her home. A melee erupted, hundreds of angry Hasidim poured into the streets, three men were dragged from a car that was then set on fire, and three police officers were injured. Supporters of Alta Fayga in Kiryas Joel claimed that they have been physically attacked, and profanities were written on their sidewalk.

Under Moshe's guidance, from 1980 until 2006, Satmar doubled in size to around 100,000–120,000 followers, the largest Hasidic group in the United States. At the time of his death, Satmar's real estate holdings were valued at hundreds of millions of dollars.

Moshe Teitelbaum was the author of a five-volume Hasidic commentary on the Bible entitled Berach Moshe.

Succession
In May 1999, Moshe Teitelbaum appointed his third son, Zalman, as the local leader of the Williamsburg congregation. Until then, he had been the leader of Satmar in Jerusalem. This was seen as a signal from Moshe that Zalman was to lead Satmar after his death, overturning the previous assumption that he would be succeeded by his eldest son, Aaron. He was his father's representative in communal affairs, and assumed his father's responsibilities when his father traveled.

Moshe's appointment of Zalman as the local leader caused factions to form around Aaron and Zalman. Aaron's supporters claimed that Moshe had been "swayed by his advisers" to appoint Zalman because they were concerned they would lose influence under Aaron's regime.

In April 2006, when Moshe died, the two sides negotiated through intermediaries over who would speak at his funeral, and in what order. Both sides declared their leader as the Rebbe.

Moshe's will named Zalman as his successor, but Aaron's supporters dispute its validity, claiming that Moshe had suffered from dementia since 1997.

Death
On April 24, 2006, at the age of 91, Teitelbaum died of cancer. Tens of thousands of members of the Jewish community attended his funeral and burial procession in Williamsburg, Brooklyn, and later in Kiryas Joel, New York. Eulogies in the main Satmar synagogue in Williamsburg were said by all the rebbe's children or their husbands, in order of their respective ages. Teitelbaum was buried near his uncle Joel in the sect's cemetery in Kiryas Joel.

Then-Governor of New York State, George Pataki, and Mayor of New York City Michael Bloomberg issued statements in remembrance of Moshe.

Moshe was survived by his wife; four sons, Aaron, Lipa, Zalmen Leib, and Shulem; two daughters, Bracha Meisels and Hendy Halberstam. At the time of his death, he had at least 86 grandchildren and great-grandchildren. At the time of his death, his first son, Aaron, and his third son, Zalman Leib, each claimed leadership of Satmar. The second son, Lipa, was the leader of a small congregation, called Zenta-Beirach Moshe Shul, in Williamsburg. His son-in-law, Rabbi Chaim Shia Halberstam, was a Satmar rebbe in Monsey, New York.

References 

1914 births
2006 deaths
Auschwitz concentration camp survivors
People from Sighetu Marmației
Rebbes of Satmar
Anti-Zionist Jews
American Hasidic rabbis
Rabbis of the Edah HaChareidis
Hungarian Orthodox rabbis
Hasidic rabbis in Europe
Rabbis from New York (state)
People from Borough Park, Brooklyn
Descendants of the Baal Shem Tov
People from Williamsburg, Brooklyn
Teitelbaum family
Romanian Orthodox rabbis
Jewish anti-Zionism in Romania